Union County is a county located in the U.S. state of Ohio. As of the 2020 census, the population was 62,784. Its county seat is Marysville. Its name is reflective of its origins, it being the union of portions of Franklin, Delaware, Madison, and Logan counties.

Union County is part of the Columbus, OH Metropolitan Statistical Area.

History

Early history
Union County has been under the rule of three countries in its history: France, England, and the present-day United States. It was discovered by the French explorer La Salle, along with traders and missionaries who accompanied him. After the French and Indian War, the Treaty of Paris of 1763 placed the area under British rule. Following the American Revolution, in 1783, the area would eventually become known as the Northwest Territory and part of the United States.

After the American Revolution, former soldiers from New England poured into Ohio after being granted land by the government. They surveyed the land, and sought to develop a state between Lake Erie and the Ohio River. Their proposals for the governance of the territory led to the passage of the Ordinance of 1787, which guided the establishment of states within the Northwestern Territory. Bitter struggles with American Indians over the next decades would follow, culminating with the battle of Tippecanoe in 1811, which saw the final defeat of the American Indian tribes in Ohio led by Tecumseh. A notable victim of the warring between the settlers and Indians was Jonathan Alder, who resided in and around the Union County area throughout his life.

Original settlements
The first town laid out in the county was North Liberty, established by Lucas Sullivant in 1797, but the first settlement in the county was made in present-day Jerome township by Joshua and James Ewing in 1798. An important settlement made in the county was by Abraham Amrine, of Swiss descent and a revolutionary soldier, in 1817, two miles (3 km) northwest of Marysville.

Formation
As part of negotiations with Virginia, who had claimed land in Ohio, to sign the Articles of Confederation, the United States granted them claims to land in Ohio which became known as the Virginia Military District. Union County was in this district. In 1803, Ohio became an independent state.

After lobbying by Col. James Curry, who represented the area in legislature at the time and a resident of what would become Jerome township, Union County was established by the Ohio legislature, and became official in 1820 with the appointment of the original commissioners: Stephen Bell, Reuben Wallace, and John Huston. The county commissioners eventually established the townships, including Union (1820), Darby (1820), Mill Creek (1820), Jerome (1821), Paris (1821), Liberty (1822), Leesburg (1825), Allen (1827), Jackson (1829), York (1834), Washington (1836), Dover (1839), Claibourne (1834), and Taylor (1849), while they designated Marysville as the county seat.

The town of Milford was established in 1816 by George Reed, Marysville in 1819 by Samuel Culbertson, Richwood in 1832 by Philip Plumber, Kingsville in 1834, Somerville in 1835, Watkins and Arbelia in 1838, Newton in 1838 by David Paul, York Center in 1841, Frankfort in 1846, Unionville in 1847, Pharisburg in 1847, New California in 1853, Dover in 1854, Union Center in 1863, Broadway in 1865, Pottersburg in 1869, Peoria in 1870, Magnetic Springs in 1879, and Claibourne in 1881.

County seat

After the organization of the county by the Ohio Legislature, Marysville was designated as the seat of Union County.  The first recorded meeting of the commissioners was in 1820.  Between 1835 and 1840, a courthouse was constructed.  Eventually a new courthouse would be built in Marysville, dedicated on January 27, 1883.  This is the present courthouse today.

In 1849, a county infirmary was authorized.  The first county jail was a log structure that sat on the southside of East Center street, in the rear of the courthouse.  Eventually a new jail was authorized by the commissioners and built in the 1870s.  In 1878 the county purchased a 10-ton safe for the treasury, that eventually was moved into courthouse.

The first county fair was held in 1847 in Marysville, in the public square.  In 1852, the Agriculture Society moved the fair to the current location, on the northside of town.  The Bible Society was organized in 1830.  On December 4, 1875, a group met at the courthouse in Marysville to organize the Union County Pioneer society.  The original members were: Eliphas Burnham, George Snodgrass, John F. Sabine, William Porter, Tobias Beightler, Abraham Amrine, Samuel Reed, Ray G. Morse, Josiah Westlake, Josiah Reed, William. M. Robinson, Hiram Kent, Edward Powers, George Reed, Robert Graham, Samuel Gamble, A. A. Woodworth, George Mitchell, Taber Randall, Joseph Dodds, William Phillips, Thomas Snodgrass, Robert Snodgrass, A. P. Robinson, R. L. Partridge, and Hylas Sabine.

In 1866, the Union County Teachers' Institute was organized in Marysville, with Franklin Wood serving at the first President.  In 1882, the Normal School was organized by J.S. Wharton, which specialized in instructing future teachers.

Early growth

Infrastructure
The county lacked transportation infrastructure until 1812, when the first known highway named Post Road was constructed across the southern portion of the county. In 1844, the legislature by act created a free turnpike that ran from Columbus to Bellefontaine, passing through Marysville, originally costing $230,000. This road eventually became what is known as U.S. Route 33 today. In 1853, the Marysville and Essex Plank Road Company was organized and constructed a road from Marysville north, through Pharisburg. The company sold capital stock for $30,000, and this road today is known as State Rt. 4. By 1915, the county had built  of roadways, the most of any county in the state for its size.

By the late 19th century and into the 20th century, the county began developing its electricity infrastructure. By 1915, electricity lines ran from Magnetic Springs to Richwood.

The county's first railroad was constructed between 1850 and 1854, a line that ran from Springfield to Delaware and crossed through the county in Milford, Marysville, Irwin, and Dover. A railroad called the New York, Pennsylvania, and Ohio line was chartered in 1851 and would eventually run through Union County with station points at Richwood, Woodland, Claibourne, Pottersburg, Broadway, and Peoria. The Columbus and Bellefontaine railroad was incorporated in 1878 and had station points in the county at Marysville. The Toledo and Central railroad ran from Columbus north through the county, with station points at Marysville, Peoria, and Raymond.

The first telegraph line was completed in 1859, which connected Marysville with the world via Springfield.

Agriculture

Because of the fertile soil in Union County, the county's farmers required minimal fertilizer. There were hundreds of farms in the county in its early stages. The crops grown in Union County's early history included wheat, oats, corn, Irish potatoes, clover and alfalfa. The county was a large producer of milk, butter, sugar, syrup, apples, and pears.

In 1911,  were owned in Union County, with 85,000 cultivated for farming. The farms had a total of 9,355 horses, 8,110 milk cows with 14,000 total cattle, 43,727 sheep, and 32,000 hogs. 312,000 pounds of wool was produced that year.

Commerce and industry

Union County was home to many industries in its original days from hotels, tanneries, distilleries, breweries, mills, asheries, manufacturers, energy production, banks, grocers, and retailers, among others.
Marysville's industrial roots can be traced back to many early companies.  Among those were the Marysville Pearlash Factory, an ashery founded in 1848, which by 1874 was the largest in the United States.  The first steam-grist mill was erected in 1856 by Saxton and Casil.  In 1867, Miller & Snodgrass constructed a flour mill.  In 1874, Marysville Butter Tub and Spoke Company was incorporated with $50,000.

A wool company, Woodbury & Welsh, constructed a brick factory on the northeast part of town in 1864, and a brewery was built in 1866 on the eastside.  In 1868, O.M. Scotts and Company was organized.  In 1871, the Marysville Cheese Manufacturing Company was built on the eastside.  Many carriage manufacturing companies were placed in Marysville, including Bauer, Schepper & Devine in 1882, City Carriage Works in 1871, and L. E. Helium in 1874.

In 1875, Rice, Fleck & Co. opened a lumberyard.  The Marysville Gas Light Company was incorporated in 1878 following almost a decade of the city using gasoline for lighting.

Richwood was home to hotels such as the Parsons House and Beem House. Large mills in Richwood included Beem and Biddle, Loveless, Howe, and Bishop, and S. M. and A. J. Blake. There were large tile manufactures, and a plethora of commercial and industrial interests including jewelers, furniture retailers, and lumber yards.

Milford Center was home to mills, distilleries, tanneries, and companies such as the Milford Center Lumber and Supply Company, Ohio Elevator and Grain Company, Robinson and Richter Company, and Childs and Cover, a carriage manufacturer.

Magnetic Springs, following the discovery of natural healing waters, became a tourist haven in the late 19th century until the innovation of modern medicine in the early 20th century. Tourists from all over the world visited the springs and stayed at resorts such as "The Park" and "The Columbus". "The Park" was home to the "Sager Sanitarium Bath".

Medicine
Union County had many medical professionals from its earliest days.  They included Dr. David Henderson, a civil war surgeon; Dr. T.B. Asbury, educated at Berkshire Medical College in Massachusetts and the nephew of Francis Asbury; Dr. J.S. Howland, who served with distinction in the civil war under Generals Burnside, Sherman, Thomas, and Gilmore; Dr. E.Y. King, who graduated from Bellevue Hospital College in New York; Dr. Andrew Sabine, who graduated from Jefferson Medical College in Philadelphia; and Dr. P.W. Lee; among many others.  Medical societies included the Union County Medical Association.

Legal
Union County was home to many notable jurists in its early history, including John F. Kinney, who practiced in Union County in 1836 and eventually became a supreme court justice in Iowa and later a congressman from Utah. Edward Stillings grew up near Milford Center and was a graduate of Harvard, and became one of the top jurists in the country, practicing before the United States Supreme Court and helping to form the legal code of Kansas in the 1870s. James Wallace Robinson was a native of Union County and went on to become a U.S. congressman in 1872. James E. Robinson, a native of Union County, would eventually become an Ohio Supreme Court justice.

Otway Curry was a nationally known poet who also became a jurist in 1840. Hylas Sabine graduated from Harvard in 1863 and practiced law in the county. Ulysses Cole, the son of Judge P.B. Cole, attended Harvard, practiced law with his father in 1867, and after being elected to the legislature in Indiana, became Deputy United States Assessor for Internal Revenue. Joseph Kennedy was admitted to the bar in 1871, and would become mayor of Marysville. Charles W. Fairbanks was admitted to the bar in 1874 and went on to become a United States Vice President.

Media

Publishing exerted great influence over public opinion in the county in its early days. Monthly and weekly publishings were the earliest known forms of the media in the county originally. The earliest known newspaper in the county was the Our Freedom and Union County Advertiser, first published in Marysville in 1839 by Stephen McClain, Robert McBrattney, and William Lawrence. The newspaper was then renamed the Union Star after a year and continued until May 1841, when it was purchased by John Cassil and renamed the Union Gazette. In 1842, the paper moved to Bellefontaine and was edited by Thomas Robb, with the paper sent weekly to Marysville. In 1843, the paper moved back to Marysville and was published until 1844. During the period it was owned by Cassil, it politically leaned Democratic.

In 1844, the paper was purchased by P.B. Cole and W.C. Lawrence, who renamed it the Argus and Union County Advertiser, and moved the politics toward the Whig party. In 1845, the paper was sold to James Alexander, and after only six weeks, sold back to John Cassil, who turned the paper back into a Democrat political newspaper. In 1846, P.B. Cole bought the newspaper back and turned it back into a Whig political newspaper. In 1849, he sold the paper to C.S. Hamilton, who renamed it the Marysville Tribune. A notable printer of the Marysville Tribune was Preston Plumb, who eventually left Marysville and became a U.S. Senator in Kansas. The paper would eventually be purchased by the Shearer family, who published daily editions that were Republican-leaning, and weekly editions that were independent.

Other papers in the county were the Eaglet, formed in 1845, and lasting only a few months. The Union Journal, formed in 1853, lasted a year. It would be moved to Xenia, where it became the Xenia News, and edited by Whitelaw Reid. The Union Press was formed in 1858 by Hylas Sabine and was Republican-leaning. In 1863, it was purchased by the Vallandighamer family and changed to the Union Democrat, which changed the paper in politics and spent its time attacking the Union government during the American Civil War. It ceased operations in 1864. In 1883, the Darby News was formed in Milford Center and eventually became the Milford Echo before folding. Also, were the Milford Ohioan was formed in 1887, the Richwood Gazette in 1872, the Richwood Reporter in 1882, which ceased operations two years later when destroyed by fire, and the Octograph Review.

In 1874, the Marysville Journal was formed by C.M. Kenton, later becoming the Union County Journal, and leaned Democratic. By 1883, the Marysville Tribune and the Union County Journal were the only newspapers published in the county. Bruce Gaumer purchased the Union County Journal in 1904, and later bought the Marysville Tribune in 1951. In 1952, Gaumer merged the two newspapers into what is known today as the Marysville Journal-Tribune.

Banking
The pioneers who composed the large majority of county residents in the early 19th century were generally very poor, meaning that there was no need for a bank in the county's early years. Trade was done by barter, including the exchange of coon and deer skins, whiskey, honey, and other durable goods. The state bank issued currency in the early periods known as "red dogs", "wildcats", and other currencies which passed through the county, with a bank note reporter published weekly to inform consumers of exchange rates of these currencies. Gold and silver was of little value in the early days, and what banks were formed usually failed.

After some banking laws were passed and the production of the county grew, currency gained value in trade, including paper, gold, and silver, and banks were permanently established in the county. The first bank in the county was the Bank of Marysville, established by Andrews, Evans, and Woods in 1854, with its first advertisement appearing in the Marysville Tribune. By 1863, they were selling the U.S. government "520 bonds". The Farmers Bank of Union County was established in 1868 on the Robinson block just east of the public square in Marysville, and by 1904 had merged with the Union Banking Company of Marysville. The Citizens Home and Savings Company was incorporated in 1889 with a million dollars in capital, located in the Liggett Building in Marysville. The Peoples Bank was organized in 1874 in Marysville, with its president being A.J. Whitney. In 1890, the Union Banking Company of Marysville was organized in Marysville by Snider, Asman, David, and Sellers. In 1909, the Commercial Savings Bank was established in Marysville by Braun, Blue, Southard, and Thorp.

In 1900, the Farmers National Bank was founded in Plain City. In 1904, the Deposit Bank was established in Raymond. Banks were formed in Milford Center including the Milford Center Bank in 1878 by Fullington and Phelps, and the Farmers and Merchant Bank of Milford Center in 1907 by Erb, Reynolds, and Burson. The first bank in Richwood was formed in 1866 by Davis and Allen, but quickly failed. In 1867, the Bank of Richwood was organized by C.S. Hamilton, and would eventually become what is known today as the Richwood Banking Company. The Union County Bank was formed in 1874 in Richwood by Cratty and Blake, the Farmers Deposit Bank of Richwood in 1884 by W.H. Conkright, and the First National Bank of Richwood was formed in 1908 by L.J. McCoy.

Modern development

Memorial Hospital of Union County was constructed in Marysville in 1952.  Many other developments would take place during this time, including the construction of the Union County Airport in Marysville, as well as numerous manufacturing companies and small housing developments throughout the county. U.S. Route 33 was expanded from a two-lane highway to a four-lane highway in the 1980s. In 1860, the county population was around 16,000. By 2000, it had grown to 40,000. For further reference, view cities, villages, and township pages.

Military heritage

Union County has a military heritage dating back to the American Revolution, and was a frequent location for the organization of military companies. Because the government paid the soldiers with land grants in the west during the revolution, Union County became home to many of these soldiers after the war. A notable soldier was Col. W.L. Curry, who served on the Virginia Line. A recorded 14 soldiers from the revolution eventually made their way to Union County, with many others unrecorded because of poor record keeping.

The War of 1812 broke out with early battles fought in the Northwest Territory, including Lake Erie. A descendant of a hero, Oliver Hazard Perry, from the War of 1812, named Robert S. Beightler, was a native of Union County. A company of 13 Union County men was assembled for this war, with many other natives of Union County joining companies from outside the county, including a company formed by Jonathan Alder. Over 100 natives of the county would serve in the war.

When the Mexican War broke in 1845 following the annexation of Texas into the United States, Union County enthusiastically provided men, totalling over 30.

The American Civil War followed, which was not greeted in the same manner the previous war was. However, Union County would provide 3200 men for that war, suffering the casualties of 1,035 wounded, killed, or missing, while producing notable leaders such as Norton P. Chipman. They fought in 31 principal battles, from Bull Run to Appomattox.

Union County would produce veterans from the Spanish–American War, World War One, Mexican Conflict, World War Two, Korean War, Vietnam War, Persian Gulf War, the Iraq and Afghanistan Wars, and the War on Terror, as well as other conflicts throughout the United States' history. Marysville native Cornelia Cole Fairbanks, wife of U.S. Vice President Charles W. Fairbanks, would serve as President of the Daughters of the American Revolution in the early 20th century.

In 2007, the Union County Veterans Remembrance Committee dedicated the Union County Veterans Memorial on the northeast lawn of the courthouse.  This was sponsored through private, public, and corporate grants and donations, including support from the Union County Foundation.  In attendance were hundreds of citizens, U.S. Representative Deborah Pryce, and many other political and civic leaders.  In 2008, the Ohio National Guard opened a new $8.2 million Marysville facility on the eastside adjacent to the YMCA. The Ohio Army National Guard headquarters in Columbus is named after Marysville native Gen. Robert S. Beightler.

Geography

Adjacent counties
 Marion County (northeast)
 Delaware County (east)
 Franklin County (southeast)
 Madison County (south)
 Champaign County (southwest)
 Logan County (west)
 Hardin County (northwest)

Major highways

Demographics

2000 census
As of the census of 2000, there were 40,909 people, 14,346 households, and 10,888 families residing in the county. The population density was 94 people per square mile (36/km2). There were 15,217 housing units at an average density of 35 per square mile (13/km2). The racial makeup of the county was 95.25% White, 2.81% Black or African American, 0.18% Native American, 0.54% Asian, 0.02% Pacific Islander, 0.22% from other races, and 0.98% from two or more races. 0.76% of the population were Hispanic or Latino of any race.

There were 14,346 households, out of which 38.50% had children under the age of 18 living with them, 64.40% were married couples living together, 8.00% had a female householder with no husband present, and 24.10% were non-families. 19.90% of all households were made up of individuals, and 7.30% had someone living alone who was 65 years of age or older. The average household size was 2.70 and the average family size was 3.11.

In the county, the population was spread out, with 27.60% under the age of 18, 7.50% from 18 to 24, 34.00% from 25 to 44, 21.20% from 45 to 64, and 9.60% who were 65 years of age or older. The median age was 34 years. For every 100 females there were 91.50 males. For every 100 females age 18 and over, there were 85.80 males.

The median income for a household in the county was $51,743, and the median income for a family was $58,384. Males had a median income of $40,910 versus $27,405 for females. The per capita income for the county was $20,577. About 3.60% of families and 4.60% of the population were below the poverty line, including 4.30% of those under age 18 and 7.80% of those age 65 or over.

2010 census
As of the 2010 United States Census, there were 52,300 people, 18,065 households, and 13,681 families residing in the county. The racial makeup of the county was 92.9% white, 2.7% Asian, 2.4% black or African American, 0.2% American Indian, 0.3% from other races, and 1.4% from two or more races. Those of Hispanic or Latino origin made up 1.3% of the population. In terms of ancestry, 34.1% were German, 15.3% were Irish, 13.6% were English, and 13.6% were American.

Of the 18,065 households, 40.8% had children under the age of 18 living with them, 62.8% were married couples living together, 8.7% had a female householder with no husband present, 24.3% were non-families, and 19.5% of all households were made up of individuals. The average household size was 2.73 and the average family size was 3.14. The median age was 36.4 years.

The median income for a household in the county was $68,452 and the median income for a family was $78,254. Males had a median income of $55,187 versus $38,094 for females. The per capita income for the county was $27,389. About 5.1% of families and 6.4% of the population were below the poverty line, including 7.9% of those under age 18 and 6.2% of those age 65 or over.

Economy

The largest industry sectors in Union County are agriculture, industrial and manufacturing, and research and development.  The county sales tax is 7.00%, and the county typically has unemployment rates below the state and national averages.

Agriculture
Agriculture makes up a large portion of the county's economy. In total, there were 1000 farms with annual revenue totaling $85 million in 2006. Western Union County sits on the edge of the northwest Ohio "wind belt," and has attracted interest from energy companies specializing in wind farms. Ohio produces in excess of five million bushels (130,000 t) of corn per year, and contributes tremendously to regional ethanol production.

There are numerous local family farms in Union County, as well as multinational agricultural services corporations like Scotts Miracle-Gro Company and Select Sires.  There is a Union County Farmer's Market, and the Ohio State University operates an agricultural extension office in the central portion of the county.

Jack Foust
A notable local area farmer is Jack Foust, who has spent more than half of a century in the agriculture industry.  His cattle at the Mayflower Farm have produced world records, while he himself has publicly served in positions appointed by the United States Secretary of Agriculture Bob Bergland and Ohio Governor Richard Celeste.  He has been chairman of the Union County Board of Elections, and is an inductee into the Ohio Agricultural Hall of Fame.

Industrial

In 2007, the estimated value of manufacturing operations in the county was well over $3.5 billion.

It is the home to major corporations, including Scotts Miracle-Gro and Univenture.  Major corporations operating regional facilities in the county include Honda of America, Goodyear/Veyance Technologies, Parker Hannifin, United Rotary Brush, and Invensys Climate Control.  The Honda operation includes the Marysville Auto Plant.  Other large companies located in the county include Sumitomo Electric Wiring Systems, Ray Lewis and Son, Velocys, MAI Manufacturing, NEX Transport, and Midwest Express, among others.

Between 2000 and 2007, Union County businesses were awarded $9.3 million in United States Department of Defense contracts.  The companies receiving those contracts were the Electronic Services Agency, Parker Hannifin, United Rotary Brush, and Leo Berbee Bulb Company.

Research and development
Union County is home to major research and development operations. Nestlé is located in Marysville, and in recent years improved their facilities with a modern, multimillion-dollar makeover. Scotts Miracle-Gro also has their R&D operations located on their corporate campus. The Transportation Research Center is located on the western county line. A unit of Univenture, Algae Venture Systems, recently made a breakthrough by developing a process to produce algae as a cost-effective biofuel.

Government

The county receives its power through Ohio statute.  It has three elected commissioners that serve four years, as well as an elected treasurer, auditor, recorder, coroner, clerk of courts, engineer, prosecuting attorney, sheriff, and judges.  In 2007, the county had $112 million in assets, and revenues of $50 million.

In 2009, the county commissioners were Gary Lee, Tom McCarthy, and Charles Hall, the common pleas court judge was Don Fraser, and the sheriff was Rocky Nelson. The probate and juvenile judge was Charlotte Eufinger, the engineer Jeff Stauch, the treasurer Tamara Lowe, the auditor Mary Snider, the clerk of courts Teresa Nickle, and the recorder Teresa Markham. The Union County Prosecuting Attorney is Hon. David Phillips. Phillips was elected prosecuting attorney in 2004.

The county is a part of the 4th U.S. congressional district in Ohio, the 86th Ohio legislative district in Ohio, and the 26th Ohio senate district.

Politics
Union County is a Republican Party stronghold. Its strong Republican roots go back to the formation of the party in the 1800s following the collapse of the Whig Party, which had previously been the preferred party.

The county has supported the Republican Party in all but two presidential elections since the Civil War, with the only Democrats to win the county being Woodrow Wilson in 1912 when the Republican Party was divided, and Franklin Roosevelt in 1932. In the last twenty-one presidential elections the Democratic candidate has only once — in Lyndon B. Johnson’s 1964 landslide when he won all but five counties in Ohio — received more than 37 percent of the county’s vote.

As part of Ohio's 5th congressional district and Ohio's 15th congressional district it had been represented by Republicans for almost seventy years until the 2008 election, when Democrat Mary Jo Kilroy, won a close, disputed contest against Steve Stivers.
In 2010, Stivers defeated her in a rematch, and after reapportionment and redistricting, the county was placed in the heavily Republican 4th district, currently represented by Jim Jordan.

The entire county is contained in the 26th Ohio Senate district and is currently represented by Dave Burke, who previously served on Marysville City Council and as the state Representative for the 83rd Ohio House district.

The entire county is contained in the 86th Ohio House district, currently represented by Tracy Richardson elected in 2018.

|}

Communities

Cities
 Dublin (part)
 Marysville (county seat)

Villages
 Magnetic Springs
 Milford Center
 Plain City (part)
 Richwood
 Unionville Center

Townships

 Allen
 Claibourne
 Darby
 Dover
 Jackson
 Jerome
 Leesburg
 Liberty
 Millcreek
 Paris
 Taylor
 Union
 Washington
 York

https://web.archive.org/web/20160715023447/http://www.ohiotownships.org/township-websites

Census-designated places
 New California
 Raymond

Unincorporated communities

 Adena Pointe
 Allen Center
 Arbela
 Arnold
 Bridgeport
 Broadway
 Byhalia
 Chuckery
 Claibourne
 Dipple
 Essex
 Fleetwood Park
 Homer
 Irwin
 Jerome
 Lunda
 New Dover
 Otter
 Peoria
 Pharisburg
 Pottersburg
 Somersville
 Watkins
 West Jackson
 Woodland
 Woodview Park
 York Center

Education
School districts include:

City school districts:
 Dublin City School District

Local school districts:
 Jonathan Alder Local School District
 Buckeye Valley Local School District
 Elgin Local School District
 Fairbanks Local School District
 Benjamin Logan Local School District
 Marysville Exempted Village School District
 North Union Local School District
 Triad Local School District

Notable people
 Robert S. Beightler - military general and contributor to the modern Interstate Highway System and Ohio Turnpike
 Chase Blackburn - world champion professional American football athlete
 Norton P. Chipman - American Civil War army officer, co-founder of the Grand Army of the Republic, author of the order creating Memorial Day
 Arthur E. Drumm - industrialist, inventor, and industrial broom pioneer
 Charles W. Fairbanks - 26th vice-president of the United States
 Hiram Gabriel - Wisconsin state legislator
 Darren Hall - professional American baseball athlete
 Cornelius S. Hamilton - United States Congressman
 John F. Kinney - American jurist and politician
 Reuben Partridge - pioneer engineer, "The Bridge Builder"
 Preston B. Plumb - United States Senator
 Martha Root - teacher of the Baháʼí Faith in the late 19th and early 20th century
 James E. Robinson - Ohio Supreme Court Justice
 James Wallace Robinson - United States Congressman
 Orlando Scott - founder of the O.M. Scott and Sons Company, later becoming the Scotts Miracle-Gro Company
 Kathryn Sellers - first federally appointed female judge in the United States
 Edward Stillings - American jurist, politician, businessman
 Thomas B. Ward - United States Congressman
 Beriah Wilkins - United States Congressman

Covered bridges of Union County

See also
 National Register of Historic Places listings in Union County, Ohio

References

External links

 Union County Government's website
 Union County Chamber of Commerce website
 Union County Genealogical Society

 
1820 establishments in Ohio